Edgar Carvalho Figueira Marcelino (born 10 September 1984) is a Portuguese footballer who plays for Amora F.C. as a right winger.

Club career
Born in Coimbra, Marcelino started his career at Sporting CP, but never represented the main squad, going on to have consecutive loan stints. He made his professional debut with F.C. Penafiel, first appearing in a 1–1 home draw against Rio Ave FC; he was an important attacking element throughout the season, as his team retained their Primeira Liga status.

For 2005–06, Marcelino was loaned to Dutch Eredivisie's RBC Roosendaal, which dropped down a level at the end of the campaign. Subsequently, released by Sporting, he joined Vitória de Guimarães in the second division, but left in January 2007 to Cypriot side AC Omonia, where he failed to establish himself.

Marcelino moved countries again in 2008–09, moving to Spanish third level team Racing de Ferrol. However, in January 2009, he returned to Cyprus with APOP Kinyras FC, joining several other compatriots in the squad and being released exactly two years later.

In 2013, after one year in Morocco, Marcelino signed a contract with Omani club Al-Seeb. On 21 August of the following year, he was drafted by FC Goa to play in the inaugural edition of the Indian Super League. He scored his first and only goal for the club on 10 December, helping to a 1–1 draw with Atlético de Kolkata.

Marcelino was signed by another Indian side on 22 January 2015, I-League's Pune FC, completing the team's foreign quota after replacing Liberian Eric Brown. He made his debut the following day, starting against title holders Bengaluru FC, providing an assist for Luciano Sabrosa in the 25th minute and being replaced later on in an eventual 3–1 win.

On 12 January 2016, Marcelino joined Cypriot Second Division club Karmiotissa FC.

Statistics

Honours
APOP
Cypriot Cup: 2008–09

References

External links

1984 births
Living people
Sportspeople from Coimbra
Portuguese footballers
Association football wingers
Primeira Liga players
Liga Portugal 2 players
Segunda Divisão players
Sporting CP B players
F.C. Penafiel players
Vitória S.C. players
G.D. Estoril Praia players
Amora F.C. players
Eredivisie players
RBC Roosendaal players
Cypriot First Division players
Cypriot Second Division players
AC Omonia players
APOP Kinyras FC players
AEP Paphos FC players
Karmiotissa FC players
Segunda División B players
Racing de Ferrol footballers
Kawkab Marrakech players
Al-Seeb Club players
Indian Super League players
FC Goa players
Pune FC players
Football League (Greece) players
Portugal youth international footballers
Portugal under-21 international footballers
Portuguese expatriate footballers
Expatriate footballers in the Netherlands
Expatriate footballers in Cyprus
Expatriate footballers in Spain
Expatriate footballers in Morocco
Expatriate footballers in Oman
Expatriate footballers in India
Expatriate footballers in Greece
Expatriate soccer players in Australia
Portuguese expatriate sportspeople in the Netherlands
Portuguese expatriate sportspeople in Cyprus
Portuguese expatriate sportspeople in Spain
Portuguese expatriate sportspeople in Morocco
Portuguese expatriate sportspeople in Oman
Portuguese expatriate sportspeople in India